Damned and Mummified is a 2004 album by Abscess; released on Red Stream.

Track listing 

 "Through the Trash Darkly" – 3:27 
 "Empty Horizon" – 4:42 
 "Swallow the Venom" – 3:29 
 "Caverns of Hades" – 5:16 
 "The Dead are Smiling at Me" – 3:54 
 "Twilight Bleeds" – 3:41 
 "Lust for the Grave" – 4:04 
 "The Dream is Dead" – 6:00 
 "Damned and Mummified" – 2:29 
 "Inferno of Perverse Creation" – 4:38 
 "Tattoo Collector" – 2:49 
 "Tirade of Hallucinations" – 3:29

References 

Personnel [edit]
Chris Reifert - Drums/Vocals
Clint Bower - Guitar/Vocals
Danny Coralles - Guitars
Joe Allen - Bass Guitar

2004 albums
Abscess (band) albums